Strawberry Shortcake has received various musical albums in the franchise's existence.

Kid Stuff albums
During the 1980s, Kid Stuff Records released soundtracks to the animated specials, read-along audiobooks featuring songs and a narrated story, and special albums.

Koch albums
For the 2003 relaunch of the franchise, DIC Entertainment partnered with their audio distributor Koch Records to release the songs from the series onto CD.

Berry, Merry Christmas

In November 2003, a 9-track EP soundtrack based on the special of the same name was released by Koch. The songs from the special are featured alongside arrangements of the classic Christmas songs "Jingle Bells" and "Deck the Halls", alongside two instrumental tracks seen in the special itself. However, the song that accompanies the feature, I Love Berries, was released in the Strawberry Jams CD instead.

Reception
The soundtrack sold over 100,000 units in its first month, and reached #7 in the Billboard children's record charts for the week of Dec. 1, 2003.

Strawberry Jams

Strawberry Jams was released by Koch in February 2004 and contains music from 3 of the original specials - Meet Strawberry Shortcake, Spring for Strawberry Shortcake and Strawberry Shortcake's Get Well Adventure, as well as songs from the special music videos for the specials (including the Merry Merry Christmas one) as well as the song from the Growing Better All the Time short.

The album was also released on audio cassette in limited quantities. The Asian release of the CD lacks the tracks I Love Berries and Friendship Grows.

The Enhanced CD bonus features are the music videos for "A Snappy Ginger Snap" and "Knock, Knock, Who's There?" and a promo for the three specials the songs feature on.

Seaberry Beach Party Music
Strawberry Jams was released by Koch in 2005 and contains music from Seaberry Beach Party, Adventures on Ice Cream Island and Play Day Surprise.

The Enhanced CD bonus features are the music videos for "Ev'ryone Loves Berry Ball" and "Tell Me a Story", as well as a promo for the franchise and two commercials for Bandai's toy range.

Music for Dress-up Days
Music for Dress-up Days was released by Koch in 2006 and contains music from Best Pets Yet, Moonlight Mysteries and Dress-up Days. This is the last Strawberry Shortcake album to be released in Europe.

The Enhanced CD bonus features are the music videos for "The Best Invention Ever" and "The Too Nice Werewolf".

The Sweet Dreams Movie
The Sweet Dreams Movie was released by Koch in 2006 and features the soundtrack to the movie of the same name, alongside a small number of extra songs.

World of Friends
World of Friends was released by Koch in 2007 and contains music from World of Friends, Berry Fairy Tales and Cooking Up Fun.

Let's Dance
Let's Dance was released by Koch in October 2007 and contains music from Berry Blossom Festival, Let's Dance and the then-unannounced Berry Big Journeys'''.

Rockaberry RollRockaberry Roll was released by Koch in August 2008 and contains songs from the Rockaberry Roll and Big Country Fun. It also contains a small number of extra tracks featured on the Strawberry Jams and Seaberry Beach Party Music CDs, and exclusive Spanish versions of "The Strawberry Shake" and the Title Theme.

CDs released with books
In addition to the abovementioned CDs, a special 10-track CD was released with the book Strawberry Shortcake: Sing-a-Long'', published by Alfred Music. The CD contains 5 full songs selected from the Strawberry Jams CD as well as the same 5 songs in minus-one, allowing one to karaoke with the songs. The CD is also special in the sense that it's the only place one can find the complete minus-one of the title theme as heard during the credits sequence of the first 4 DVDs or 4/8 episodes of the show.

References

Children's music
Strawberry Shortcake